The 2000 NAPA 500 was a NASCAR Winston Cup Series racing event that was held on November 20, 2000, at Atlanta Motor Speedway in Hampton, Georgia. It was originally scheduled for November 19, but was postponed due to rain and run on Monday. It was the 34th and final race of the 2000 NASCAR season.

Jerry Nadeau, driving the #25 Michael Holigan Chevrolet Monte Carlo for Hendrick Motorsports, won the race. It was his first victory in the Winston Cup Series the only victory he would record during his career.

Following the race, the Winston Cup was formally awarded to series champion Bobby Labonte, the driver of the #18 Interstate Batteries Pontiac Grand Prix for Joe Gibbs Racing. Labonte had won the Winston Cup championship the previous week by finishing 4th in the Pennzoil 400 at Homestead-Miami Speedway, and he followed that up with a 5th place finish in this race.

Background
This race was home to a series of finales. Among them:

This was the final race to be broadcast on ESPN until 2007 and the last one with its broadcast team of Bob Jenkins, Benny Parsons, and Ned Jarrett. Jenkins would remain at ESPN in his role as their lead voice for the Indy Racing League, while Parsons joined NBC Sports for their NASCAR broadcasts. Jarrett, meanwhile, retired from broadcasting after over twenty years covering events for ESPN and CBS.
This would also be the final race in the career of Darrell Waltrip, who called the 2000 season his “Victory Tour” in the #66 Kmart Ford Taurus for Haas-Carter Motorsports.
Wally Dallenbach Jr. also retired from full-time racing after the race, as he had signed to join Parsons as a booth analyst for NBC. He drove the #75 Pizza Hut /TBS (American TV channel) Ford for Galaxy Motorsports in the race. 
Scott Pruett, who had joined the Cup Series for 2000 driving the #32 Tide Ford Taurus for PPI Motorsports, finished what would be his only full time season driving in NASCAR; he was released from the team after the season.

Other notes regarding drivers changing teams:

After spending the previous seven seasons as an owner-driver, Bill Elliott ran his final race in his #94 McDonald’s Ford Taurus. He sold his team to Ray Evernham, who promptly signed Elliott to pilot one of his two Dodge Intrepids for 2001.
Michael Waltrip ran his last race in the #7 NationsRent Chevrolet for Ultra Motorsports. He would join Dale Earnhardt, Inc. to drive the #15 NAPA Auto Parts Chevrolet in 2001. 
Robby Gordon ran his last race for Team Menard in the #13 Turtle Wax Ford, as the team shut down after the season.
Bobby Hamilton ran his last race in the #4 Kodak Chevrolet for Morgan-McClure Motorsports. He would move over to drive the #55 Square D Chevrolet for Andy Petree Racing in 2001 replacing Kenny Wallace, who would take over the #27 Eel River Racing Pontiac from Mike Bliss, whose team failed to qualify for this race.
Buckshot Jones ran his last race for his family owned team in the #00 Crown Fiber Pontiac, as he was signed by Petty Enterprises to join the team for 2001. 
Kevin Lepage attempted to qualify the #16 Familyclick.com Ford for Roush Racing, but did not make the field; this would prove to be his final ride in the car and the last full-time race for the #16 until 2003.

In addition, several teams were running their last races with their current manufacturers. Below are teams that were all joining Dodge’s effort in NASCAR for 2001.

Bill Davis Racing, which fielded the #22 Caterpillar Pontiac for Ward Burton, the #93 Amoco Ultimate Pontiac for Dave Blaney, and the #23 AT&T Pontiac for Scott Wimmer.
Team SABCO, which fielded the #40 Bellsouth Chevrolet for Sterling Marlin and the #01 Coors Light Chevrolet for Bobby Hamilton Jr. This was also the team’s last race with Felix Sabates as sole owner. 
Petty Enterprises, which fielded the #43 Cheerios Pontiac for John Andretti and saw Steve Grissom fail to qualify the #44 Hot Wheels Pontiac. 
Melling Racing attempted to qualify the #9 Kodiak Ford with Stacy Compton but did not make the field.

Finally, some notable teams were also running their last races with their current sponsors:

Mark Martin’s #6 Ford was running its final race with Valvoline sponsorship as the team signed on to sponsor Johnny Benson Jr.’s #10 at MB2 Motorsports. The team picked up sponsorship from Pfizer for 2001, with its Viagra brand promoted (this led to Eel River Racing losing its sponsorship). 
Dale Jarrett ran his last race in the #88 with Ford Credit as his primary sponsor; he would begin running with United Parcel Service as his sponsor the next year and would carry that sponsorship for the remainder of his racing career.
John Deere ceased sponsoring the #97 Ford after the race. This left Kurt Busch, who had taken over the ride near the end of the season, sponsorless entering 2001, but he would eventually become identified with his new sponsor Newell Rubbermaid and its Sharpie line of writing implements.

In an unexpected final occurrence, Dale Earnhardt recorded the last top five finish of his racing career as he finished second to Nadeau. The reason this was unexpected was because of his death in the Daytona 500 at the beginning of the following season.

Race report
It wasn't uncommon for a NASCAR Winston Cup Series race in the 1990s to have only three to five cars on the lead lap. If someone spun, didn't hit the wall or anyone else, and could fire it up and get going, there would be no reason to wave a caution flag for multiple laps. Between 8-12 cars on the lead lap was considered to be a typical performance at a NASCAR Winston Cup Series race during the 1990s; a far cry compared to the more than 15 cars on the lead lap at short track in the current NASCAR.

Approximately 14% of the race was run under a caution flag; the average green flag run was 31 laps. Several accidents and oil spills caused eight caution periods for 44 laps. Three hundred and twenty-five laps were completed in 3 hours, 32 minutes and 32 seconds. Jerry Nadeau beat Dale Earnhardt to the finish line by 1.338 seconds to win the race (his first and only victory in Winston Cup competition). ESPN's Bob Jenkins, calling his last Winston Cup event for ESPN, called the finish thus:

As the competitors of the race completed lap 320, Dale Earnhardt finally achieved the feat of completing 10000 laps in a single NASCAR Winston Cup Series season before his death at the 2001 Daytona 500. The race was officially started shortly after 1:00 PM Eastern Standard Time and finished at approximately 4:32 PM EST.

Geoff Bodine finished last due to an engine problem on lap 11. Buckshot Jones was the lowest finisher to complete the event, finishing in 37th place, 48 laps behind the lead lap drivers. Jeremy Mayfield had a winning racecar that was forced to leave the race on lap 53 due to engine problems; this performance was typical of his 2000 NASCAR Winston Cup Series season. Darrell Waltrip finishes 34th in his final Cup start and 7 laps behind Jerry Nadeau; even though it was certainly not the "victory tour" that he had planned. For the 2001 season, Waltrip would begin working as a color commentator for Fox Sports' coverage of Winston Cup racing. Waltrip's retirement also ended a rocky relationship between himself and Travis Carter Motorsports that lasted since the 1998 NASCAR Winston Cup Series season.

In the views of certain fans, the final years of Waltrip's NASCAR career had involved him taking a metaphorical back seat to Jeff Gordon; who was a rising star back then. Darrell Waltrip's career with Fox Sports commenced with the Budweiser Shootout on February 11, 2001. The following week, Waltrip provided commentary for the fateful Daytona 500 race in which the death of Dale Earnhardt occurred on that race's final lap. Thankfully, the sport has gotten much safer since Dale Earnhardt was killed behind the wheel in 2001, and drivers like Ryan Newman are still with us. The sport has become more technology-dependent in the 21st century, however, and pure driving skill has been thrown aside in favor of luck-based strategies which involves the use of the ever-advancing technology and complicated mathematics involving angles and estimating the vehicles' maximum velocity.

43 drivers, all born in the United States of America qualified for the NAPA 500, driving either Chevrolet, Ford or Pontiac cars. 13 other drivers failed to qualify, including Dick Trickle, Hut Stricklin, Morgan Shepherd and Hermie Sadler. Individual race earnings for each driver ranged from $180,550 to Jerry Nadeau ($ when adjusted for inflation) to $34,982 to last-place finisher Geoff Bodine ($ when adjusted for inflation). The total purse for the event was $2,336,442 ($ when adjusted for inflation).

Notable crew chiefs who actively participated in this race included Robin Pemberton, Jimmy Fenning, Tony Eury, Sr., Greg Zipadelli, Donnie Wingo, Larry McReynolds, Hut Stricklin, Jeff Hammond among others.

This was the last NASCAR race of the 20th century and of the 2nd millennium. While the price of gasoline and oil would remain cheap throughout the first five years of the 21st century, the constant threat of fossil fuel depletion eventually caused NASCAR to adopt electronic fuel injection as a fuel-saving measure. Concern for the environment also caught the eye of NASCAR officials during the 21st century; they would make an attempt to reduce the carbon footprint that NASCAR elevated during the 1970s, 1980s, and 1990s.

The 2000 NASCAR Winston Cup Series season was when the average NASCAR fan could see some changes in the pecking order brewing. Matt Kenseth was an excellent young contender who could compete alongside Steve Park and Dale Earnhardt Junior. Fourteen different drivers would win, which was a substantial number back then.

At least five of the drivers involved in this race are no longer living as of 2020, including Blaise Alexander, Dick Trickle, Dale Earnhardt, Bobby Hamilton, and John Andretti. Only Kurt Busch still remains in the NASCAR Cup Series from this race; making him one of NASCAR's elder statesmen.

Qualifying

Top 20 finishers

Timeline
Section reference:
 Start of race: Jeff Gordon started the race with the pole position.
 Lap 5: Jerry Nadeau took over the lead from Jeff Gordon.
 Lap 11: Geoffrey Bodine had an engine problem, making him the last-place finisher.
 Lap 14: Caution due to Geoffrey Bodine's accident, ended on lap 17.
 Lap 18: A problematic engine forced Elliott Sadler out of the race.
 Lap 21: Caution due to oil on the track, ended on lap 26.
 Lap 27: Jeremy Mayfield took over the lead from Jerry Nadeau.
 Lap 37: Mandatory competition caution handed out by NASCAR officials, ended on lap 40.
 Lap 38: Ward Burton took over the lead from Jeremy Mayfield.
 Lap 47: Jeremy Mayfield took over the lead from Ward Burton.
 Lap 53: Jeremy Mayfield had to leave the race due to a faulty engine; causing Jerry Nadeau to take over the lead.
 Lap 54: Caution due to oil on the track, ended on lap 60.
 Lap 55: Scott Wimmer took over the lead from Jerry Nadeau.
 Lap 64: Steve Park took over the lead from Scott Wimmer.
 Lap 69: Caution due to Michael Waltrip's accident, ended on lap 74.
 Lap 82: Dale Earnhardt took over the lead from Steve Park.
 Lap 94: Jerry Nadeau took over the lead from Dale Earnhardt.
 Lap 111: Caution due to Tony Stewart's accident, ended on lap 115.
 Lap 112: Kenny Wallace took over the lead from Jerry Nadeau.
 Lap 113: Jerry Nadeau took over the lead from Kenny Wallace.
 Lap 122: Mark Martin failed to finish the race because his engine acted up.
 Lap 125: Michael Waltrip was involved in a terminal crash.
 Lap 130: Caution due to Michael Waltrip's second accident, ended on lap 135.
 Lap 195: Buckshot Jones was involved in a terminal crash.
 Lap 196: Jerry Nadeau took over the lead from Bobby Labonte.
 Lap 257: Ward Burton took over the lead from Jerry Nadeau.
 Lap 297: Jerry Nadeau took over the lead from Ward Burton.
 Lap 300: Mike Skinner took over the lead from Jerry Nadeau.
 Lap 301: Ward Burton took over the lead from Mike Skinner.
 Lap 313: Caution due to Scott Pruett spinning out of control in the backstretch, ended on lap 318.
 Lap 319: Jerry Nadeau took over the lead from Ward Burton.
 Finish: Jerry Nadeau was officially declared the winner of the event.

Standings after the race

References

NAPA
NAPA 500
NASCAR races at Atlanta Motor Speedway
November 2000 sports events in the United States